Celebrity Big Brother 2 may refer to:

 Celebrity Big Brother 2 (UK), the 2002 UK series of Celebrity Big Brother
 Celebrity Big Brother 2 (U.S.), the 2019 U.S. season of Celebrity Big Brother
 Big Brother Famosos 2, the 2002 season of Big Brother Famosos, the Portuguese version of Celebrity Big Brother
 Big Brother VIP 2, the 2003 season of Big Brother VIP in Hungary
 Big Brother VIP 2, the 2003 season of Big Brother VIP in Mexico
 Big Brother VIPs 2, the 2006 season of Big Brother VIPs in Belgium
 Bigg Boss (India): 
 Bigg Boss (Hindi season 2), the 2008 Hindi season of Bigg Boss, the Indian version of Big Brother 
 Bigg Boss Kannada 2, the 2014 Kannada season of Bigg Boss, the Indian version of Big Brother
 Bigg Boss Bangla 2, the 2016 Bengali season of Bigg Boss, the Indian version of Big Brother
 Bigg Boss Tamil 2, the 2018 Tamil season of Bigg Boss, the Indian version of Big Brother
 Bigg Boss Telugu 2, the 2018 Telugu season of Bigg Boss, the Indian version of Big Brother
 Gran Hermano VIP 2, the 2005 VIP season of Gran Hermano, the version of Big Brother in Spain
 Grande Fratello VIP 2, the 2017 VIP season of Grande Fratello, the version of Big Brother in Italy
 HaAh HaGadol VIP 2, the 2015 VIP edition of HaAh HaGadol, the Israeli version of Big Brother
 Hotel Big Brother, the 2009 season of Big Brother VIPs in the Netherlands
 Pinoy Big Brother: Celebrity Edition 2, the 2007-2008 celebrity season of Big Brother in the Philippines
 Promi Big Brother 2, the 2014 season of Promi Big Brother, the celebrity version of Big Brother in Germany
 Veliki brat VIP 2, the 2008 celebrity season of Veliki brat, the version of Big Brother in Serbia, Bosnia and Herzegovina, Montenegro
 VIP Brother 2, the 2007 season of VIP Brother in Bulgaria

See also 

 Celebrity Big Brother
 Celebrity Big Brother 3 (disambiguation)